Ellen J. Park (born March 6, 1972) is an American lawyer and Democratic Party politician who was elected in the 2021 New Jersey General Assembly election as an assemblywoman for New Jersey's 37th legislative district, making her the first Korean American woman to be elected to the New Jersey Legislature.

Political career
Born in South Korea, Park moved to the United States as a child and was raised in the New York City neighborhoods of Sunnyside and Flushing. She attended Bronx High School of Science and New York University. She earned a Juris Doctor degree from the Hofstra University Maurice A. Deane School of Law. She was elected in 2016 to serve on the Englewood Cliffs, New Jersey Borough Council. In the November 2021 general election, she was elected together with her running mates, making her the first Korean woman to serve in the state legislature.

Committees 
Committee assignments for the current session are:
Financial Institutions and Insurance
Science, Innovation and Technology

District 37
Each of the 40 districts in the New Jersey Legislature has one representative in the New Jersey Senate and two members in the New Jersey General Assembly. The other representatives from the 37th District for the 2022—23 Legislative Session are:
Senator Gordon M. Johnson (D)
Assemblywoman Shama Haider (D)

References

External links
Legislative webpage

1972 births
Living people
21st-century American politicians
American people of South Korean descent
American politicians of Korean descent
American women of Korean descent in politics
Maurice A. Deane School of Law alumni
The Bronx High School of Science alumni
South Korean emigrants to the United States
People from Englewood Cliffs, New Jersey
People from Flushing, Queens
People from Sunnyside, Queens
Politicians from Bergen County, New Jersey
Democratic Party members of the New Jersey General Assembly
New Jersey city council members
New Jersey lawyers
New York University alumni